Johannes Hau (17 April 1771, Flensburg - 3 August 1838, Reval) was a Baltic-German landscape painter.

Life and work 
His father, Jens Petersen Hau, was a ship's captain. In 1795, he left his hometown and moved to Tallinn (Reval, in German). From 1818 until his death, he was the guild's chairman.

He is best remembered for his small-scale vedute of Reval and Narva done in gouache. These were very popular with upper-class people from St. Petersburg, who came to visit the city's spas. In 1823, he organized an exhibition at his home, which was one of the first solo exhibitions of any type held in Reval.

He was interred at the Kopli cemetery, which was destroyed in the 1940s, during the second Soviet occupation of the Baltic states.

His two sons, Eduard and Woldemar Hau, also became well known painters.

Views of Reval (Tallinn)

References

External links 

 Baltische Historische Kommission, entry for Johannes Hau. In: Baltisches Biografisches Lexikon Digital
 More works by Johannes Hau at the Art Museum of Estonia, Digital Collection

1771 births
1838 deaths
Baltic-German people
18th-century German painters
18th-century German male artists
Estonian painters
Landscape painters
People from Flensburg
19th-century German painters
19th-century German male artists